Las Limas Monument 1, also known as the Las Limas figure or the Señor de las Limas, is a  greenstone figure of a youth holding a limp were-jaguar baby. Found in the State of Veracruz, Mexico, in the Olmec heartland, the statue is famous for its incised representations of Olmec supernaturals. It is the largest known greenstone sculpture.

Interpretation
Sculptures of headdressed figures holding inert were-jaguar babies appear often in the Olmec archaeological record, from the smallest of figurines to the huge table-top thrones such as La Venta Altar 5.

What these sculptures symbolised to the Olmecs is not clear.  Some researchers, focusing on the symbolic cave surrounding the figure on Altar 5 believe that these sculptures relate to myths of spiritual journeys or human origins.  Others find that the limp depiction of the were-jaguar baby denotes child sacrifice.

History

It was probably carved during the Middle Formative Period, some time between 1000 and 600 BCE).

The statue was discovered in near Jesús Carranza, Veracruz, by two local children, Rosa and Severiano Paschal Manuel.  Dug out and taken to their nearby home, it was declared "La Virgen de las Limas" and set up on its own altar. Word of the find reached archaeologists in Xalapa. After promising to keep the statue on display and to build a local school, the archaeologists moved the sculpture to the Xalapa Museum of Anthropology, in Veracruz.

Five years later, in October 1970, the statue was stolen from the museum, only later to be found in a motel room in San Antonio, Texas; it had been apparently too famous to be sold on the black market. It was subsequently restored to display at the Xalapa Museum of Anthropology.

References

Sources
 (1968) Discovering the Olmec, American Heritage.
"The Antiquities Market", in Journal of Field Archaeology, Vol. 1, No. 1/2 (1974), pp. 215–224.
, "El Señor de las Limas", Actualidades Arqueológicas, Número 10 Enero-Febrero 1997.  
 (1996) "In Search of the Olmec Cosmos: Reconstructing the World View of Mexico's First Civilization". In E. P. Benson and B. de la Fuente (eds.), Olmec Art of Ancient Mexico. Washington, D.C.: National Gallery of Art: 51-60. .
 
 (2007) Olmec Archaeology and Early Mesoamerica, Cambridge University Press, UK. 
 (1995) "Olmec-style Iconography", Foundation for the Advancement of Mesoamerican Studies, Inc., accessed March 2007.

Further reading
 (1971) "A Study in Olmec Iconography", in Studies in Pre-Columbian Art and Archaeology No. 7, Dumbarton Oaks, Washington, D.C.

Olmec art
Statues in Mexico